Psychonavigation is a collaborative album by Bill Laswell and Pete Namlook, released on April 25, 1994 by FAX +49-69/450464.

Track listing

Personnel 
Adapted from the Psychonavigation liner notes.
Musicians
Bill Laswell – bass guitar, electronics, musical arrangements
Pete Namlook – electronics, musical arrangements
Technical personnel
Thi-Linh Le – cover art
Robert Musso – engineering

Release history

References

External links 
 Psychonavigation at Bandcamp
 

1994 albums
Collaborative albums
Bill Laswell albums
Pete Namlook albums
FAX +49-69/450464 albums
Subharmonic (record label) albums